Fathy is a given name and a surname. Notable people with the name include:

Fathy Salama, Egyptian musician
Hassan Fathy, Egyptian architect

See also
Fathi